Gharmen may refer to:

 Lower Gharmen, a village in Sughd Province, Tajikistan
 Upper Gharmen, a village in Sughd Province, Tajikistan